Abaytikau (Abajtyqæw) is a rural locality (a selo) in Tseyskoye Rural Settlement of Alagirsky District, Russia. The population was 42 as of 2018.

Geography 
Nizhny Tsey is the nearest rural locality.

References

External links 
 Administration of Mazanovsky District

Rural localities in North Ossetia–Alania